Gentiana linearis, the narrowleaf gentian, is a  tall flowering plant in the Gentianaceae family. It is native to northeastern North America from Manitoba to Maine, and to the Appalachian Mountains of West Virginia, Virginia, and Tennessee. Similar to the "bottle gentians" like Gentiana clausa and Gentiana andrewsii, it has paired, lanceolate leaves, usually on unbranched stalks, and blue or purple blooms which remain closed or nearly closed; the leaves are narrower however, as the specific name indicates.

References

linearis
Flora of the Northeastern United States
Flora of Eastern Canada
Flora of the Southeastern United States
Flora of the Appalachian Mountains
Flora of the Great Lakes region (North America)
Plants described in 1796
Taxa named by Josef Aloys Frölich
Flora without expected TNC conservation status